Ruth Kasdan (1918–2008) was a Swedish stage and film actress and singer.

Selected filmography
 Prince Gustaf (1944)
 The Girls in Smaland (1945)
 When Love Came to the Village (1950)
 In the Arms of the Sea (1951)
 The Beat of Wings in the Night (1953)
 The Cats (1965)

References

Bibliography
 Steene, Birgitta. Ingmar Bergman: A Reference Guide. Amsterdam University Press, 2005.
 Wright, Rochelle. The Visible Wall: Jews and Other Ethnic Outsiders in Swedish Film. SIU Press, 1998.

External links

1918 births
2008 deaths
Swedish film actresses
Swedish stage actresses
20th-century Swedish actresses
Actresses from Stockholm

sv:Ruth Kasdan